Chantal is a commune in the Les Cayes Arrondissement, in the Sud department of Haiti.
It has 31,030 inhabitants.

Settlements

References

Populated places in Sud (department)
Communes of Haiti